Serrabone Priory is a former monastery of Canons Regular in the commune of Boule-d'Amont, in Pyrénées-Orientales.  The priory is located in a wild and beautiful area in the valley of the Boulès in the heart of an oak forest, at the centre of the Aspres mountain range on the eastern foothills of the Canigou, about 30 km from Perpignan.

It is famous for its splendid marble rostrum from the 12th century, regarded as a masterpiece of Romanesque art.

History

The name of the monastery derives from the Catalan "serra bona", meaning "good mountain".  The original foundation - of which order if any is unclear - on the site took place in the 10th or 11th century and is recorded in a document of 1069. In 1082, under the patronage of the local lords and the Count of Conflent, who gave it property and revenues,  it was re-established as an Augustinian priory.

Architecture 

The first church at Serrabone had just one nave with a pointed barrel vault.

An extensive transformation took place in the 12th century. A transept and three apses replaced the earlier chevet. The principal apse, protruding on the exterior, is flanked by two absidoles enclosed in the walls. On the north side there is a second nave and a bell tower, on the south side a cloister, and another building containing three rooms.

The thick walls of the nave are built of local schist rubble stone. The second construction was more elaborate and used large blocks of cut schist which were carefully placed.

The sculptures in the cloister, the main portal, the window in the apsidole and the gallery, are all worked in pink marble from the Conflent, which makes a startling contrast to the green-grey of the schist.

References

External links 

 Serrabone Priory official page
  Art-Roman.net: photos of Serrabone
 On Google map
 Visiting information

Christian monasteries established in the 11th century
12th-century churches in France
Buildings and structures in Pyrénées-Orientales
Augustinian monasteries in France
Romanesque architecture in France
Churches in Pyrénées-Orientales
Monuments historiques of Pyrénées-Orientales